Ollie & Scoops is an American comedy animated web series created by animation director, writer and editor Nico Colaleo. Nico is also known for creating the animated web series Too Loud for DreamWorksTV and has been working in the animation field since 2011, working at studios such as Titmouse, Inc., Nickelodeon Animation Studio, Disney Television Animation, and most currently Netflix Animation. Nico is also an art gallery curator, so far hosting a dozen art shows and events around the Los Angeles animation and artist community since 2013.

Premise
The series stars 9-year-old Ollie Purkleworth, who can communicate with and understand cats. So naturally, Ollie and her family pet cat Scoops are inseparable best friends. The show follows Ollie and Scoops as they go on amazing, bizarre, and unique misadventures brought upon by Ollie's gift of being able to communicate with cats; whether at her home, school, in their neighborhood, or down in the secret underground cat society, the vast city of Catlifornia.

Characters

Main characters
 Ollie (voiced by Kimmy Robertson) - A 9 year old girl and the series' main protagonist. She looks out for Scoops, her family pet cat and also best friend, but sometimes can't help but causing trouble herself. Her heart is always in the right place though, and by the end of every episode she will always set things right if she has steered things too far off course.
 Scoops (voiced by Eric Bauza) - The family's pet cat, and best friend of Ollie. Known fully as Scoopleton P. Scoopsworth, he's known Ollie since he was a newborn kitten, being a gift from Ollie's parents for her 6th birthday. While Scoops can frequently cause trouble due to clumsiness, ego, selfishness, or being a bit of a showoff, deep down he'll do anything to help Ollie and correct whatever mischief he's caused the two of them.

Supporting characters
 Julia Goldburger (voiced by Grey Griffin) - A classmate of Ollie's. Julia is an ego-centric, school-obsessed perfectionist who needs to be the best at everything. She is considered the main antagonist of the series, but is more of a comedic annoyance than an evil / negative villain.
 Carl (voiced by Rachael Russakoff) - A classmate of Ollie's. A mild-mannered, shy Jewish boy, with an angsty teenaged older sister named Stacy. Also, Carl may have a secret crush on Ollie...
 Stacy (voiced by Emily Brundige) - Ollie's babysitter, and older teenaged sister of Carl. She is surly, rude and has plenty of that classic teen angst, but deep down she really does love her little brother Carl.
 Binnie Bivvins (voiced by Kelsy Abbott) - Ollie's 29 year old, neurotic, but sweet and caring 4th grade teacher at Davis County Elementary. She loves her students and to teach kids, but at the same time she's still sort of figuring herself out.
 Wendy Whippleworth (voiced by Rebeka Thomas) - Ollie's science teacher at Davis County Elementary. She is in a relationship with Ollie's primary teacher, Miss Bivvins.
 Principal J. Liquids (voiced by Piotr Michael) - The principal of Davis County Elementary, Ollie's school. An homage/parody of film director John Waters.
 Biscuits (voiced by Tiana Camacho) - A tough alley cat that Scoops has a huge crush on.
 Merle (voiced by Rich Evans) - A thin, sleazy, conniving alley cat who frequently causes Ollie and Scoops all kinds of trouble. Brunk is his main associate/lackey.
 Brunk (voiced by Mike Stoklasa) - A big orange-furred lummox of an alley cat who frequently causes Ollie and Scoops all kinds of trouble. He is Merle's right-hand man.
 Mayor Scrumpy (voiced by Nico Colaleo) - The Mayor of Catlifornia. A cat with sky blue fur who is always wearing a Mayoral sash.
 Poopsie St. Pierre (voiced by Vivienne Medrano) - A flirty, rich and spoiled little lady cat who most of the boy cats have crushes on.
 Dan Dipple (voiced by Brock Baker) - If Top Cat was crossed with a used car salesman.
 Hoagie (voiced by Matt Brailey) - A clumsy cat with dark blue fur who might be the unluckiest guy on the planet.
 Rudy (voiced by Adam McArthur) - A little guy with red fur who loves to act cool and suave. Has an "on again off again" relationship with Poopsie St. Pierre.
 Cuddles (voiced by Candi Milo) - A little cat with pink fur and a very cutesy personality.
 Macaroni and Cheese (voiced by Daron Nefcy) - A very cute fluffy white cat who turns big, scary and demonic when annoyed or angered.
 Dr. Toodles (voiced by James Urbaniak) - A local mad scientist who lives in a big laboratory deep within the shores of Catlifornia Harbor.
 Brother Whiskers (voiced by JD Ryznar) - A cat who appears in the episode "Warm Cream", and who may or may not be a member of Terry Bumble's kitty cult.
 Brother Puddles (voiced by Rich Evans) - A cat who, like Whiskers, appears in the episode "Warm Cream", and who may or may not be a member of Terry Bumble's kitty cult.
 Claudia Grimson (aka The Creepy Girl) (voiced by Mara Wilson) - A stoic goth girl and new friend that Ollie meets at the video store.
 Dougie the Lab Cat (voiced by Dana Snyder) - A cat who has recently escaped from laboratory testing, leaving him with some short fuses and major paranoia. He has silver fur and a collar with a pink heart on it.
 Terry Bumble (voiced by Mike Stoklasa) - A geeky man-child with a dangerous obsession with all things cats. He has pale skin, orange hair, braces, and blue green eyes.
 The Bad Tempered Cinema Geek (voiced by James Rolfe)  - A chair-bound film geek and critic who loves making video reviews complaining about movies on the internet.

Production and release
In June 2019, the series began airing on YouTube. Natasha Weir works as a character designer, while Nicole Hardy did animation work on the series, using Adobe Animate CC. Ashley Nichols, an animator for the Hazbin Hotel pilot and Colaleo's "Too Loud" series, worked as an animator for the series. Colaleo created the series, but also directs and produces it.

In February 2021, Colaleo shared with Terry Ibele, on his Animation Industry Podcast, about his job, how he started Ollie & Scoops, and the resources it takes to create each episode. In the interview he revealed that he did the initial designs for the characters then gave them to Natasha Weir, the character designer, said he created originally for pitching it to animation studios but that Cartoon Network and Nickelodeon turned it down and told him to come back in a few years. He further noted that Netflix rejected it because they had Hilda, said that each episode costs $10,000 to $15,000, that at least 20 people work on each episode, and hopes the show could get bigger until they get studio funding.

In January 2022, Toon Boom interviewed Colaleo who noted and explained many different and interesting points about creating your own animated series: He has said that being a showrunner involves making sure your crew is happy, checking in with them to gather their work, giving notes and tweaks, and has mentioned that he is, as showrunner, "involved with and in charge of every single part of the show." He has said that it's important to always be open to hearing ideas from your show's crew of artists. He also revealed that he works with at least 30 people per episode, including the storyboard artists, animators, clean-up artists, and voice actors, nearly doubling in growth from the first year of the show when only 10 to 15 people worked on each episode. He further noted that he originally pitched Ollie & Scoops "all over Burbank" (to Nickelodeon, Cartoon Network, Disney, and Netflix, so far) and started producing and working on Ollie & Scoops on his own when Too Loud ended, adding that he wanted to choose an all ages route rather than an adult route for the show.

Episodes

Season 1 (2019–present)

Reception
The series was received positively. One reviewer praised the voice cast and described the show as a "hidden gem of a series." Burkely Hermann, a reviewer for The Geekiary, described the series as unique. He also praised the voice acting, music, LGBTQ representation, animation, and character development in the series.

References

External links

Official Website
Official Newgrounds page
Official Bandcamp page

American adult animated web series
2010s American adult animated television series
2020s American adult animated television series
2010s American LGBT-related comedy television series
2020s American LGBT-related comedy television series
2019 web series debuts
Adult comedy web series
American adult animated comedy television series
Independent animation
LGBT-related animated web series
English-language television shows
Animated television series about cats
Animated television series about children
2010s YouTube series
2020s YouTube series